Erythronium grandiflorum is a North American species of plants in the lily family. It is known by several common names, including yellow avalanche lily, glacier lily, and dogtooth fawn lily. The Ktunaxa name for glacier lily is maxa.

Description
Erythronium grandiflorum grows from a deep bulb (or corm) which is 3 to 5 centimeters wide. Its two green leaves are wavy-edged and up to 20 centimeters long. The stalk may reach 30 centimeters tall and bears one to three showy flowers. Each flower has bright lemon yellow petals, white stamens with large white to yellow to red anthers, and a white style.

The Flora of North America recognizes two subspecies, the yellow-flowered subsp. grandiflorum and the white- to cream-flowered subsp. candidum. More recent publications consider subsp. candidum to be a distinct species, called Erythronium idahoense.

Distribution and habitat
It is native to western North America from British Columbia and Alberta south to New Mexico and California, though it has not been reported from Arizona or Nevada. It can be found in subalpine mountain meadows, slopes, and clearings.

Ecology 
The flower is pollinated by bumblebees and other bees. The bulbs are an important and preferred food of the grizzly bear. Mule deer readily eat the foliage.

Uses 
The bulbs can be eaten cooked, or raw to avoid starvation (though they can cause nausea this way). The leaves and flowers are also edible raw or cooked.

Gallery

References

External links
United States Department of Agriculture, National Forest Service, Index of Species Information
Calphotos Photo gallery
Northern Bushcraft

grandiflorum
Flora of North America
Plants described in 1814
Root vegetables